Gilles de la Bourdonnaye (born 27 January 1973) is a French para table tennis player who competes in international level events. He is a triple Paralympic champion, triple World champion and thirteen time European champion. His right arm was amputated when he was three years old after an elevator accident.

Sporting career
He started competing internationally at the 1990 World Para Table Tennis Championships and retired in the 2008 Summer Paralympics. de la Bourdonnaye came out of retirement eleven years later, aged 46, when he participated at the 2019 European Championships in Helsingborg where he won his first medal since 2008 when he won a silver medal in the teams events.

He has won team event titles with numerous other competitors including Philippe Roine, Jeremy Rousseau and Matéo Bohéas.

Return to sport
de la Bourdonnaye made his decision to come out of retirement and make a bid to compete in his sixth Paralympic Games by hoping to qualify for the 2020 Summer Paralympics.

References

External links
 
 

1973 births
Living people
Sportspeople from Nantes
Paralympic table tennis players of France
Table tennis players at the 1992 Summer Paralympics
Table tennis players at the 1996 Summer Paralympics
Table tennis players at the 2000 Summer Paralympics
Table tennis players at the 2004 Summer Paralympics
Table tennis players at the 2008 Summer Paralympics
Medalists at the 1992 Summer Paralympics
Medalists at the 1996 Summer Paralympics
Medalists at the 2000 Summer Paralympics
Medalists at the 2004 Summer Paralympics
Medalists at the 2008 Summer Paralympics
French amputees
French male table tennis players
Paralympic medalists in table tennis
Paralympic gold medalists for France
Paralympic silver medalists for France
Paralympic bronze medalists for France
Table tennis players at the 2020 Summer Paralympics
20th-century French people
21st-century French people